Patriarch Michael may refer to:

 Patriarch Michael I of Alexandria, Greek Patriarch of Alexandria in 860–870
 Patriarch Michael I of Constantinople, Ecumenical Patriarch in 1043–1058
 Patriarch Michael I of Antioch, ruled in 1166–1199
 Patriarch Michael II of Alexandria, Greek Patriarch of Alexandria in 870–903
 Michael II of Constantinople, Ecumenical Patriarch in 1143–1146
 Patriarch Michael II of Antioch, head of the Syriac Orthodox Church in 1292–1312
 Patriarch Michael II Fadel, ruled in 1793–1795
 Michael III of Constantinople, Ecumenical Patriarch in 1170–1178
 Michael IV of Constantinople, Ecumenical Patriarch in 1207–1213